Bad Dream is the first LP of the Italian melodic metal band Dimmi Argus. The album is recorded in Italy, published by Tanzan Music, released digitally by FreeMood Promotion, mixed by Daniele Mandelli and mastered by Timo Tolkki at Studiotolkki, Helsinki, Finland.

Track listing
"Black And White" 5:44 (music & lyrics written by Dimitar Argirov)
"Bad Dream" 3:53 (music & lyrics written by Dimitar Argirov)
"Wish I Could" 4:56 (music & lyrics written by Dimitar Argirov)
"Victims Of The Nightmare" (intro) 1:19 (lyrics written by Dimitar Argirov)
"From the grave" 5:11 (music written by M.Galabov, D.Argirov, R.Doychinov, S.Petrov, S.Hristov;  lyrics written by R.Doychinov & D.Argirov )
"Into The Void"  (Black Sabbath cover) 5:06 (music & lyrics written by Osbourne, Iommi, Butler, Ward)
"Pray For Our Souls" 5:58 (music written by M.Galabov, D.Argirov, R.Doychinov, S.Petrov, S.Hristov;  lyrics written by R.Doychinov & D.Argirov )
"This Silence" 5:02 (music & lyrics written by Dimitar Argirov)
"My Way Home" 4:11 (music written by D.Argirov & Dragomir Draganov; lyrics written by D.Argirov)
"Into The Forest" 4:01 (Bulgarian Folklore Song) (lyrics written by Dimitar Argirov)
"Black And White Radio Edit" (digital release bonus track) 4:39 (music & lyrics written by Dimitar Argirov)

Singles
 "Wish I Could" – published by Tanzan Music and released digitally on 29 June 2012 by FreeMood Promotion.

Personnel
 Dimmi Argus – vocals, backing vocals, keyboards
 Matteo Calza – guitars, backing vocals
 Filippo Spezia – bass, backing vocals 
 Andrea Cassinari – drums

Production
 Daniele Mandelli – mixing
 Timo Tolkki – mastering

References
 Dimmi Argus: nuovo album presto online - TrueMetal.it (In Italian)
 Album news on Pro-Rock Magazine (In Bulgarian)
 Album anticipation news on MetalBest.bg (In Bulgarian)

External links
 Dimmi Argus's Official Site
 Tanzan Music's Official Site

2013 debut albums
Dimmi Argus albums